Nadia Plesner is a Danish/Dutch painter who works and lives in the Netherlands. Plesner is working on issues that lie between the editorial and advertising and often with political undertones. She trained at the Graphic Arts Institute, Copenhagen (Denmark) and at the Gerrit Rietveld Academie, Amsterdam ( the Netherlands).

KISS 2013
KISS (Keep It Simple, Stupid) is her new campaign against the modern world and modern culture. It shows a naked Sarah Palin and Ronald McDonald acting against God's will in the Garden of Eden. The painting was first shown in Denmark and made great headlines and discussions.

Legal action by Louis Vuitton

In April 2010 Nadia Plesner was sued by Louis Vuitton for showing her controversial painting Darfurnica. The painting, reproduced in the "Simple Living" T-shirts, depicts an undernourished African child holding a fashionista dog and a designer handbag resembling  Louis Vuitton's Monogram Multicolore handbag. In a larger painting featuring the child, he stands in the conflict-ridden region of Darfur in Sudan.
The fashion giant issued a cease and desist order for alleged copyright infringement. A Dutch court imposed daily fines of approximately 7,500 US dollars.
The trial attracted much international attention and several artists and celebrities supported Nadia Plesner as they believed that the case also referred to artistic expression and the right to make the world aware of international issues in an artistic way.
Prior to the trial was also a previous conflict in 2008 between Nadia Plesner and Louis Vuitton, which was about an artistic campaign called Simple Living. 
In 2011 the Dutch court reversed its decision and acquitted Nadia Plesner. Darfurnica was sold in 2011 for approximately 45,000 US dollars.

Speeches
Beside her paintings Nadia is giving speeches about art, advertising and property rights in international forums.
 2013: United Nations, Geneve
 2013: Arken Modern Museum of Art, Denmark
 2013: Curated By Law, Stuttgart Germany
 2013: Conference on artistic freedom, Oslo Norway

Exhibitions
 2013: Gallery Kik, Denmark (solo exhibition)
 2012: International Art Festival, Denmark (group exhibition)
 2011: Project 8, Denmark (group exhibition)
 2011: Emergency Room, Vietnam (group exhibition)
 2011: Oxcars, Spain (Free Culture Forum)
 2011: Emergency Room, Poland (group exhibition)
 2011: Heart Museum, Denmark (exhibition)
 2011: Intervention, Denmark (solo exhibition)
 2010: The Christmas Show, Denmark (group exhibition)
 2009: Artistes de Garde, Denmark (group exhibition)
 2008: Emergency Room, Italy (group exhibition)
 2008: Emergency Room, France (group exhibition).

International awards
 2011: Nominated for the JCI Ten Outstanding Young People´s award. 
 2011: Oxcars award.
 2008: Cosmopolitan´s Provocateur Of The Year award

References

External links
nadiaplesner.com

Danish painters
Dutch painters
Year of birth missing (living people)
Living people